This article compares several selected genealogy programs that run on a web server. Genealogy websites are not included.

General information

System support

General features

Chart features

Site administration features

Visitor features

See also 
 List of genealogy databases

References 

 
Genealogy